Idle-Along (IA) - is a class of sailing dinghy (or small centreboard yacht) designed by Alf (Unc) Harvey at Petone (Wellington, NZ) in 1927. It grew to considerable popularity in the 1950s but its popularity gradually diminished during the 1960s. A redesigned hull for plywood construction by John Spencer kept the class going but on a smaller scale with a small revival in the 1990s with about 10 new boats being built.  The Idle-Along is also sometimes referred to as IdleAlong, Idle Along, IA, I Class and Idie.

The premium annual trophy for the Idle-Along was the Moffat Cup - which was first sailed for in 1936. The Moffat Cup was revived in 2010 at Birkenhead and sailed again in 2011 in the Bay of Islands. The 2012 Cup was to be sailed in Taupo but economic pressure has seen the race rescheduled to Auckland as the Alf Harvey Memorial Regatta.

See also
Dinghies
New Zealand
Sailing

Further reading
 Ronald Carter (1944) Little Ships. The story of the birth and growth of New Zealand's yachting fleet from the earliest recorded events to the year 1940. See pages 113-114 for history of the class.
 Ronald Carter (1954) Glory of Sail. A Pictorial Study of Auckland Yachts. Photos by Max Frommherz. See photos of Khama IA 49, Suzanne (IA 39) on pp 96–97, Soneri on pp 104–105,
 Grahame Anderson (1999) FAST LIGHT BOATS, a Century of Kiwi Innovation.
 Harold Kidd and Robin Elliott (1999) Southern breeze. A history of yachting in New Zealand.

External links
Worser Bay Boating Club
Idle-Along Association of NZ
Idle-Along championships revived - Hobsonville 21-22 Nov 2009

Dinghies